Tomás Aresta Branco Machado Ribeiro (born 30 April 1999) is a Portuguese professional footballer who plays for Swiss club Grasshopper Club Zürich as a central defender.

Club career

Belenenses
Ribeiro was born in Lisbon, and he joined C.F. Os Belenenses' youth system at the age of 15. He made his Primeira Liga debut for the renamed Belenenses SAD on 15 September 2019, playing the entire 3–1 away win against C.S. Marítimo.

In January 2020, Ribeiro injured his right knee during training, going on to be sidelined for several months. He continued to be a starter under Petit after his recovery, scoring his first league goal on 20 February 2021 to open a 2–1 home victory over C.D. Nacional. The previous 27 December, he had been sent off for two quick yellow cards in the 1–2 loss to Sporting CP also at the Estádio Nacional, the second for handball.

Grasshoppers
On 26 January 2022, Ribeiro signed a four-and-a-half-year contract with Swiss Super League club Grasshopper Club Zürich, rejoining his compatriots and former Belenenses teammates André Moreira and André Santos. He started in his first appearance four days later, a 2–0 defeat at FC Sion. He missed the vast majority of the season, due to a meniscus injury. 

Ribeiro returned to action on 6 August 2022, as a last-minute substitute against FC St. Gallen. One week later, he was directly involved in both of his team's goals, first equalising then providing the cross for Renat Dadashov in the 2–2 away draw with Sion.

References

External links

1999 births
Living people
Portuguese footballers
Footballers from Lisbon
Association football defenders
Primeira Liga players
Belenenses SAD players
Swiss Super League players
Grasshopper Club Zürich players
Portuguese expatriate footballers
Expatriate footballers in Switzerland
Portuguese expatriate sportspeople in Switzerland